Chapter One refers to a first chapter in a book.

Chapter One or Chapter 1 or Chapter I may also refer to:

Albums
Chapter One (Collage album) (1994)
Chapter One (Ella Henderson album) (2014)
Chapter One (John Sykes album) (1998)
Chapter One (Viking Skull album) (2003)
Chapter 1 (EP), by Kane Brown (2016)
Chapter 1, by Mae Muller (2019)
Chapter One: Blue, a 2017 EP by Bea Miller
Chapter One: Latin America, a 1973 album by Gato Barbieri
Chapter One: Greatest Hits (2002), by Jay Z
Greatest Hits – Chapter One (Kelly Clarkson album) (2012)
The Hits – Chapter One (Backstreet Boys album) (2001)
The Hits Chapter 1 (Sammy Kershaw album) (1995)
Soul Assassins, Chapter 1 (1997), by Soul Assassins
Chapter One (2007), by the Olympic Symphonium

Television
"Chapter 1" (American Horror Story)
"Chapter 1" (House of Cards)
 "Chapter 1: The Mandalorian", an episode of the first season of The Mandalorian
"Chapter 1" (Legion), the pilot episode of Legion
"Chapter One: The River's Edge", the pilot episode of Riverdale
"Chapter 1: Stranger in a Strange Land", the first episode of The Book of Boba Fett
"Chapter One: The Vanishing of Will Byers", the first episode of Stranger Things

Other uses
Chapter One (restaurant), a restaurant in Dublin
Spider-Man: Chapter One, a comic book series
Al-Fatiha, the first chapter of Quran

See also
The First Chapter (disambiguation)